The Melk Abbey Library (Deutsch: Stiftsbibliothek Melk), also known as the Library of Melk Abbey, is an Austria-based monastic library located in Melk, Austria. The library has many rare medieval manuscripts, as well as a large inventory of Baroque literature.

In July 2019, a researcher discovered fragments of a famous early erotic work - Der Rosendorn or The Rose Thorn - in the Melk Abbey Library, which allows the poem date back to around 1300, two hundred years earlier than previously thought.

References

Libraries in Austria
Monastic libraries